Euseius stipulatus is a species of mite in the family Phytoseiidae.

References

stipulatus
Articles created by Qbugbot
Animals described in 1960